Highmore is a city in and county seat of Hyde County, South Dakota, United States. The population was 682 at the 2020 census.

History
A post office called Highmore has been in operation since 1882. The city was named from its lofty elevation.

It was near Highmore that South Dakota Attorney General Jason Ravnsborg struck and killed a pedestrian in 2020.

Geography
Highmore is located at  (44.518700, -99.441106).

Highmore has been assigned the ZIP code 57345 and the FIPS place code 28960.

Climate
Highmore has a humid continental climate (Köppen climate classification: Dwa).

Demographics

2010 census
As of the census of 2010, there were 795 people, 347 households, and 201 families residing in the city. The racial makeup of the city was 91.7% White, 6.5% Native American, 0.1% Asian, 0.4% from other races, and 1.3% from two or more races. Hispanic or Latino of any race were 1.9% of the population.

There were 347 households, of which 24.8% had children under the age of 18 living with them, 47.3% were married couples living together, 6.9% had a female householder with no husband present, 3.7% had a male householder with no wife present, and 42.1% were non-families. 39.8% of all households were made up of individuals, and 20.5% had someone living alone who was 65 years of age or older. The average household size was 2.18 and the average family size was 2.94.

The median age in the city was 47.4 years. 23.1% of residents were under the age of 18; 5.6% were between the ages of 18 and 24; 18.4% were from 25 to 44; 26.2% were from 45 to 64; and 26.8% were 65 years of age or older. The gender makeup of the city was 47.5% male and 52.5% female.

2000 census
As of the census of 2000, there were 851 people, 378 households, and 210 families residing in the city. The population density was 445.3 people per square mile (172.0/km2). There were 432 housing units at an average density of 226.0 per square mile (87.3/km2). The racial makeup of the city was 95.89% White, 3.41% Native American, 0.24% Pacific Islander, and 0.47% from two or more races. Hispanic or Latino of any race were 0.12% of the population.

There were 378 households, out of which 26.2% had children under the age of 18 living with them, 45.8% were married couples living together, 6.3% had a female householder with no husband present, and 44.2% were non-families. 41.8% of all households were made up of individuals, and 25.1% had someone living alone who was 65 years of age or older. The average household size was 2.15 and the average family size was 2.99.

In the city, the population was spread out, with 23.1% under the age of 18, 5.6% from 18 to 24, 22.1% from 25 to 44, 21.4% from 45 to 64, and 27.7% who were 65 years of age or older. The median age was 45 years. For every 100 females, there were 83.8 males. For every 100 females age 18 and over, there were 79.7 males.

The median income for a household in the city was $29,135, and the median income for a family was $45,469. Males had a median income of $30,227 versus $20,000 for females. The per capita income for the city was $17,309. About 3.3% of families and 8.2% of the population were below the poverty line, including 4.2% of those under age 18 and 18.5% of those age 65 or over.

See also
 List of cities in South Dakota

References

External links

 Highmore, SD government website

Cities in South Dakota
Cities in Hyde County, South Dakota
County seats in South Dakota